Willow Creek is a 2013 independent found footage horror film written and directed by Bobcat Goldthwait. It stars Alexie Gilmore and Bryce Johnson as a couple who go into the woods of Willow Creek, California looking for material for their documentary on Bigfoot lore.

Plot
Set in Humboldt County, California, Jim (Bryce Johnson), a stout believer in Bigfoot, and his girlfriend Kelly (Alexie Gilmore), who is not sure if Bigfoot really exists at all, are traveling to Six Rivers National Forest in Northern California, where Jim plans to shoot his own Bigfoot footage at the site of the Patterson–Gimlin film.

The two stop off first in Willow Creek, the Bigfoot capital of the world, where Jim interviews various locals about Bigfoot. At a restaurant, they notice a missing woman on a poster on the wall. While heading into the forest in search of the Patterson–Gimlin filming location, they encounter a man who angrily tells them to leave, but Jim and Kelly ignore him. They set a camp in the middle of the woods, but after return to it from a swim, they find it trashed.
That evening, Jim proposes to Kelly, but feeling that it is too soon, decides they should move in together instead and they go to sleep.
	
That night they are awakened by mysterious sounds echoing through the woods, and whooping vocalizations. Cowering inside their tent, they can hear large creatures moving about outside, pushing into and investigating the tent; and the distant sound of a woman crying. The noises grow closer and something hits their tent. Scared, the couple decides to leave at dawn. In the morning, Jim discovers a clump of gray fur. They wander in circles through the thick woods while hearing the same noises they heard the night before. During the night, Jim and Kelly encounter a naked woman who was on the missing person poster from Willow Creek. An unseen creature attacks them, killing Jim and abducting Kelly whose cries for help are heard in the distance. The movie ends with three whooping vocalizations also heard in the distance.

Cast
 Alexie Gilmore as Kelly
 Bryce Johnson as Jim
 Peter Jason as an ex-Forest Ranger (credited as Ranger Troy Andrews)
 Laura Montagna as Missing Woman
 Bucky Sinister as Angry Man at Road
 Timmy Red as Ukulele Singer
 Steven Streufert as himself
 Shaun L. White Guy Sr. as herself
 Nita Rowley as herself
 Tom Yamarone as himself

Release and reception
The film was premiered at the 2013 Independent Film Festival of Boston, and subsequently screened within such festivals as Maryland Film Festival.

Willow Creek has received generally positive reviews from critics. Review aggregation website Rotten Tomatoes gives the film a score of 86% (based on 51 reviews). The website's consensus states: "Writer-director Bobcat Goldthwait's first foray into horror doesn't break any new ground, but it does wring fresh terror from a well-worn genre formula—and offers a few nasty laughs in the bargain."

References

External links
 
 

2013 films
2013 horror films
2013 independent films
2010s mystery horror films
American natural horror films
American independent films
American mystery horror films
Bigfoot films
2010s English-language films
Films about couples
Films directed by Bobcat Goldthwait
Films set in California
Films set in forests
Found footage films
Films with screenplays by Bobcat Goldthwait
Humboldt County, California
2010s American films